The Bessemer Pipemakers were a Minor League Baseball team that represented the city of Bessemer, Alabama. They played in the Southeastern League in 1912. A previous team played in Bessemer in 1904 in the Tennessee–Alabama League.

References

External links
Baseball Reference

Defunct minor league baseball teams
Professional baseball teams in Alabama
Defunct Southeastern League teams
Defunct Tennessee-Alabama League teams
Baseball teams established in 1904
Baseball teams disestablished in 1912
1904 establishments in Alabama
1912 disestablishments in Alabama
Defunct baseball teams in Alabama